This is a list of English women Twenty20 International cricketers. A Twenty20 International is an international cricket match between two representative teams, each having Twenty20 International (T20I) status, as determined by the International Cricket Council (ICC). A T20I is played under the rules of Twenty20 cricket.

The list is arranged in the order in which each player won her first Twenty20 cap. Where more than one player won her first Twenty20 cap in the same match, those players are listed alphabetically by surname.

Key

Players
Statistics are correct as of 24 February 2023.

References

 
England
Cricket Women Twenty20
Cricketers
Cricket